The Alpheus Mead House is a historic house located along Massachusetts Avenue in Cambridge, Massachusetts, United States.

Description 
The house has a -story wood-frame structure with a mansard roof. Dormers piercing the roof are topped either by shallow gables or segmented-arch roofs. Modillions line the main roof eave and windows are topped by over-length projecting lintels. The house has also retained its elaborately decorated porch. Built in the mid-1860s, this Second Empire house is one of just a few such houses to survive along Massachusetts Avenue. Its first documented owner was Alpheus Mead, a butcher.

The house was listed on the National Register of Historic Places in 1982.

See also
National Register of Historic Places listings in Cambridge, Massachusetts

References

Houses on the National Register of Historic Places in Cambridge, Massachusetts
Houses completed in 1867
Second Empire architecture in Massachusetts